Showeta (Russian and Tajik: Шовета (transliteration Shoveta), Yaghnobi Шоԝета or Шоԝԝета) is a village in Sughd Region, northwestern Tajikistan. It is part of the jamoat Anzob in the Ayni District. Its population was 8 in 2007.

References

Populated places in Sughd Region
Yaghnob